Frontera is a 2014 American Western drama film directed by Michael Berry. The film stars Eva Longoria, Michael Peña, Ed Harris and Amy Madigan.

Plot
On the border between the U.S. and Mexico, Miguel Ramirez crosses the border illegally for work. Upon entering the United States, he meets Olivia, the wife of Roy, a former sheriff and the owner of the land Miguel is currently passing through. Olivia gives him and his companion Jose water and a blanket, and departs after telling them there is a highway not too far away where they can try to stop a ride.

Shortly afterwards, local boys who are out shooting their fathers' guns without permission, decide to start shooting at Miguel and Jose in an effort to scare them back across the border. Olivia rides back to investigate, but the shots scare the horse she was riding and she falls and hits her head on a rock. Miguel tries to help while Jose runs off, but is scared away by Roy who came because of the gunfire.

Olivia is pronounced dead by the paramedics, and Jose joins two other illegal Mexican immigrants who break into an American family's house, stealing food, money and a car from them. Meanwhile, Miguel finds a job gardening.

A grieving Roy starts investigating his wife's death. He first accuses Miguel, thinking he was trying to steal her horse. He finds the bullet casings the boys left behind, as well as a vigilante who shoots illegal Mexican immigrants. Roy tries to ride after the vigilante's vehicle but can not catch it.

Jose is arrested by state troopers and deported to Mexico. The local police inform Roy that his wife's riding blanket was found in the car. Meanwhile, a cop identifies Miguel based on a description Roy gave the police and arrests him. He is taken into police custody since he is regarded as the prime suspect in Olivia's death and is to be tried for first degree murder. Miguel contacts his wife's parents to tell them what happened. When his wife Paulina finds out she tries to cross the border herself.

Paulina is raped on the way to the United States and is taken captive for a ransom that her family cannot pay. Roy visits Miguel in his cell and hears his side of the story. Touched by Miguel's work ethic, he tries to help him find his wife. Roy confronts one of the parents of the boys who caused Olivia's death, a sheriff himself, and finally convinces him to drop the murder charges against Miguel.

Paulina is found by chance in an empty house and is reunited with her family. Roy offers Miguel a job repairing the broken fence between his land and Mexico. They agree to meet each other on his side of the fence so Roy can pay Miguel and Miguel can do the repairs from Mexico. Miguel thanks Roy for the new job and sets to work immediately. Roy admires Miguel's work ethic and starts riding off to his farm.

Meanwhile, the vigilante is back, this time aiming at Miguel who is still repairing the fence. However, Roy stops the vigilante at the last minute, saving Miguel.

Cast
Eva Longoria as Paulina Ramirez
Michael Peña as Miguel Ramirez
Ed Harris as Roy McNary
Amy Madigan as Olivia McNary
Matthew Page as Carl
Julio Cedillo as Ramon / Main Coyote
Seth Adkins as Sean
Daniel Zacapa as Abuelo
Lora Martinez-Cunningham as Laura Zamora
Michael Ray Escamilla as Jose
Aden Young as Sheriff Randall Hunt

Reception
On Rotten Tomatoes, the film has an approval rating of 54% based on 24 reviews, and an average rating of 6.30/10. The site's critical consensus reads: "Frontera is solidly cast, handsomely mounted, and well-acted; unfortunately, it's also rather dull and fairly forgettable". Christy Lemire of RogerEbert.com gave the film 2.5 out of 5 while Metacritic gave it 58 out of a 100, basing its score on 13 critical reviews.

References

External links

Films shot in New Mexico
2014 drama films
American drama films
2010s English-language films
2010s American films